These are lists of Pakistani provincial governors.

 List of current Pakistani governors
 Governor of Balochistan, Pakistan
 Governor of Gilgit-Baltistan
 Governor of Khyber Pakhtunkhwa
 Governor of Punjab, Pakistan
 Governor of Sindh

provincial governors